Annavarapu Lanka is a village in Kollipara mandal of Guntur District in Andhra Pradesh, India. It is situated on the banks of Krishna River. This village falls under Tenali (Assembly constituency) and is 20 kilometers far from Tenali Town. It takes approximately 1 hour to reach Vijayawada, the second largest city of the state from the village. Amaravati, the state capital is 50 km away from this village.

Agriculture
Farming is the livelihood for 95% of the population either directly or indirectly. The major crops grown includes Banana, Maize, Turmeric, Elephant foot yam, Black gram and Lemon. It is quite common for farmers to lose their crops during Krishna river floods.

Landmarks 
This village has a Zilla Parishad High School, a Rice Mill, 4 Churches and a temple of Rama.

Religion
70% of the people are Christians and rest of them are Hindus.

Villages in Guntur district